Sakaddi (Hindi: सकड्डी) is a village and gram panchayat in Koilwar block, Bhojpur district in the Indian state of Bihar. Situated between Arrah and Koilwar, it is a large village with around 8,294 residents (Census 2011).

Politics
The Sakaddi village is a part of Sandesh assembly seat under the Arrah Lok Sabha.

Transport

Railway
 Kulharia railway station (1 km)
 Koelwar railway station (4 km)
 Arrah Junction (10 km)

Roads
 Patna-Arrah-Buxar (NH-922)
 Sakaddi-Nasriganj (SH-81)

References

Villages in Bhojpur district, India